Rogier Benschop (born 20 July 1998) is a Dutch professional footballer who plays as a left winger for Vierde Divisie club RKSV Halsteren.

Career
Benschop made his professional debut for PEC Zwolle in a 4–0 Eredivisie loss to ADO Den Haag on 22 December 2017.

In 2020, Benschop joined USV Hercules, who he left again in December 2022. He moved to RKSV Halsteren from January 2023.

References

External links
 
 
 Eredivisie Profile
 Sport.de Profile

1998 births
Living people
Dutch footballers
PEC Zwolle players
Almere City FC players
USV Hercules players
RKSV Halsteren players
Eredivisie players
Eerste Divisie players
Tweede Divisie players
Derde Divisie players
Association football forwards